Spring Fever is a 1919 short comedy film directed by Hal Roach and featuring Harold Lloyd.

Plot
Harold is an office worker whose mind wanders from his mundane clerical tasks because of the lovely weather.  Unable to resist the pull of a park on a beautiful spring day, Harold walks out on his job.  He is pursued into the park by irked office colleagues and his boss.  Harold's playful antics in the park quickly annoy several people, causing a large mob to start chasing him.  While hiding in some shrubbery, Harold encounters Bebe who herself is hiding from an unwanted suitor (Snub).  The mob attacks Snub, thinking he is Harold.  Bebe and Harold quietly escape to an ice cream parlor where Harold has insufficient money to pay for their treats.  Harold attempts a few creative tricks to avoid paying the bill.  In the end, Harold deceives the waitress into thinking that a still groggy Snub has agreed to pay his tab. The film ends in Bebe's garden with Harold and Bebe embracing as a new couple.

Cast
 Harold Lloyd 
 Snub Pollard 
 Bebe Daniels  
 George K. Arthur
 Ray Brooks
 Sammy Brooks
 Lige Conley - (as Lige Cromley)
 Wallace Howe
 Bud Jamison
 Mark Jones
 Dee Lampton
 Gus Leonard
 Fred C. Newmeyer
 E.J. Ritter
 Charles Stevenson
 Noah Young

Preservation status
Prints of the film exist in the film archives of George Eastman House, UCLA Film and Television Archive, and the National Film Archive of the British Film Institute.

See also
 Harold Lloyd filmography

References

External links

1919 films
1919 comedy films
American silent short films
American black-and-white films
Films directed by Hal Roach
1919 short films
Silent American comedy films
American comedy short films
1910s American films